The 1943–44 Illinois Fighting Illini men's basketball team represented the University of Illinois.

Regular season
March 1, 1943, changed the future of Fighting Illini men's basketball when the team was broken up due to all five starters from back-to-back Big Ten Conference championships heading to active duty in the armed forces.  The group who left, known as the Whiz Kids, consisted of 21-year-old All-America forward Andy Phillip and 20-year-olds Ken Menke, Gene Vance, Jack Smiley and Art Mathisen. Phillip went on to become a member of the Naismith Basketball Hall of Fame.
Four of the five, minus Mathisen, returned to Illinois and tried to recapture the glory for one more season in 1946–47 after the war ended, but the chemistry had changed as well as their talent. Illinois went 14–6.

The 1943–44 season, however, was a struggle for head coach Doug Mills, as it was the second worst season of his career. The overall record was 11 wins and 9 losses with a conference mark of 5 and 7. The team finished with a 6 - 4 record at home and a .500 record on the road at 5 - 5. The Illini returned only one player from the 1942-43 season, Gordon Horton, who wasn't even a starter, which meant the entire lineup was made up of rookie/unproven players.  The starting lineup consisted of Walton Kirk,  Howard Judson, Ray DeMoulin, Bob Morton, Don Delaney and Gordon Gillespie.

Roster

Source

Schedule

|-
!colspan=12 style="background:#DF4E38; color:white;"| Non-Conference regular season

|- align="center" bgcolor=""

|-
!colspan=9 style="background:#DF4E38; color:#FFFFFF;"|Big Ten regular season

Bold Italic connotes conference game
												
Source

Player stats

Awards and honors
Walt Kirk
Converse Honorable Mention All-American (1944)
Stan Patrick
Team Most Valuable Player

References

Illinois Fighting Illini
Illinois Fighting Illini men's basketball seasons
1943 in sports in Illinois
1944 in sports in Illinois